Upper Stewiacke is a small community located in Colchester County in central Nova Scotia.  Upper Stewiacke can be reached by road via Route 289. Upper Stewiacke was founded in 1783 by Matthew Johnson, son of James Johnson, a Grantee of Truro, Nova Scotia.  Johnson's supplies had come from Truro, some 20 miles away. In 1983, a special event and reenactment was held to mark the 200th Anniversary of the arrival of Matthew Johnson and his wife Ruth (née Fisher).

Notable residents
 Lyle Creelman (1908-1997), the first Canadian nurse to work for the World Health Organization.
 James F. Ellis, physician and politician

Navigator

Climate

References

External links
Upper Stewiacke

Communities in Colchester County
General Service Areas in Nova Scotia